Environmental Technology Verification (ETV) consists of the verification of the performance of environmental technologies or, in other words, it is the establishment or validation of environmental technology performance by qualified third parties based on test data generated through testing using established protocols or specific requirements. 
Several ETV programs are running worldwide, organized through government initiatives, with the pioneer program being the one developed in the United States of America, followed by the Canadian ETV Programme. Other programs have run, or are running, in South Korea, Japan, Bangladesh, Denmark, France, Europe, the Philippines, and China. Each program has its own definitions, structure and procedures and programs are not always inter-compatible. In 2007, an ETV International Working Group was formed to work on the convergence of the different programs towards mutual recognition - under the motto Verified once, verified everywhere. The work of this group was at the origin of the request for drafting an ETV ISO standard. This resulted in establishing an ISO working group under Technical Committee 207 (Environmental Management), Sub-committee 4, Working Group 5 - Environmental Technology Verification (ISO/TC 207/SC 4/WG 5). When completed, the ISO standard will have the number ISO/NP 14034.

The US ETV Program

The Environmental Technology Verification (ETV) Program of the Environmental Protection Agency (EPA) in the United States develops testing protocols and verifies the performance of innovative environmental technologies that can address problems that threaten human health or the natural environment. ETV was created to accelerate the entrance of new environmental technologies into the domestic and international marketplace by providing objective technology information on commercial-ready technologies. ETV is a voluntary program.  Developers/vendors of environmental technologies are not required to participate in the program, nor are they required to seek verification. ETV does not pass or fail and does not rank technologies. All verification reports and statements are made publicly available on the ETV Website.

Centers
ETV has five centers which are called verification organizations. These verification centers are run through a cooperative agreement:

 Advanced Monitoring Systems Center — The center verifies the performance of commercial-ready technologies that monitor contaminants and natural species in air, water, and soil. The center tests both field-portable and stationary monitors, as well as innovative technologies that can be used to describe the environment (site characterization).
 Air Pollution Control Technology Center — This center verifies commercial-ready technologies that control stationary and mobile air pollution sources, and mitigate the effects of indoor air pollutants.
 Drinking Water Systems Center — This center verifies the performance of commercial-ready drinking water treatment systems for use in small communities, or individual homes and businesses.
 Greenhouse Gas Technology Center — This center verifies the performance of commercial-ready technologies that produce, mitigate, monitor, or sequester greenhouse gas emissions.
 Water Quality Protection Center — This center verifies the performance of commercial-ready technologies that protect groundwater and surface waters from contamination.

Environmental and Sustainable Technology Technology Verifications (ESTE)
A component of ETV which was added in 2005 to address priority environmental technology categories for meeting the USEPA needs for credible performance information. Priority is given to technologies that can address high-risk environmental problems.

ETV Accomplishments, Impacts, and Outcomes
ETV has  verified over 400 technologies and developed more than 90 protocols.  A survey of participating vendors completed in 2001 showed overwhelming support for the ETV program.  Responses indicated that 73 percent of the vendors were using ETV information in product marketing, and 92 percent of those surveyed responded that they would recommend ETV to other vendors. 

In 2006, EPA published a two-volume set of case studies which document actual and projected outcomes from verifications of technologies in 15 technology categories (ETV Program Case Studies Vol 1 EPA/600/R-06/001 and ETV Program Case Studies Vol II EPA/600/R-06/082).

An Association of State Drinking Water Administrators (ASDWA) survey showed that 34 states recognize and use ETV reports.  ASDWA and its members rely heavily on these evaluations to support the use of new technologies and products in the drinking water industry. 

Designating a product or technology as ETV “verified” does not mean a given technology reduces every emission, has no drawbacks, or outperforms solutions not on the “verified” list.

Designating a product or technology as “verified”  means that a given technology produced “X” outcome, when tested according to a specific protocol.

Verified diesel emission reduction technologies and their outcomes
Biodiesel:  Reduced inorganic (soot) carbon emissions, Increased NOx emissions  - Increased organic carbon (SOF / VOC) emissions.
Diesel Particulate Filter (various manufacturers): Reduces TPM,  Does Not Address NOx.
Diesel Oxidation Catalyst (various manufacturers) : Reduces TPM, Does Not Address NOx.
Clean Diesel Technologies fuel borne catalyst: potential fine metallic emissions & potential resulting health effects - need PM filter - minimal NOx reduction.
Purinox - water / diesel fuel emulsion:  PM/HC/CO emissions can increase as a result of tuning to compensate for decreased power- only summer blend verified
Envirofuels Diesel Fuel Catalyzer:  verified on tier 0 locomotive engine - verification report specifies an increase in total particulate (TPM) emissions on the treated fuel, as compared to the baseline fuel, even though the gaseous emissions and visible smoke opacity decreased significantly.
Envirofuels diesel fuel catalyzer showed a verified fuel consumption reduction.

Composition of total diesel particulate matter and the relation to smoke opacity
The composition of  TPM (total diesel particulate matter) is the sum of "dry" particulates, and "wet" particulates.

"Dry" Particulate emissions are also known as inorganic soot, black carbon, or elemental carbon.

"Wet" particulates are also known as organic carbon, soluble organic fractions (SOFs) and volatile organic compounds (VOCs).

The exact ratio of "wet to dry" diesel particulate matter will vary by engine load, duty cycle, fuel  composition and specification, and engine tuning.

An opacity reading is a measurement of the level of visible inorganic carbon, also known as soot. Opacity measurements cannot detect organic carbon emissions, VOC / SOF emissions, or NOx emissions.

Specialized instrumentation is required to determine organic carbon levels, and to detect other unseen  particulates. When used in conjunction with an opacity meter, the technician can detect (for example) an increase in TPM, and detect a decrease in visible smoke (opacity) emissions.

Function as a neutral clearinghouse 
The ETV verification program (and other verification pathways) publish the verification reports, technology options charts, and technical summaries, once testing has been completed.

The ETV testing facility will issue press releases on behalf of the technology vendor, upon completion of testing.

The ETV verification program reports all outcomes, and leaves the ultimate decision regarding the   suitability and applicability of a given technology to the discretion of the end user. Additional research may be necessary in order to adequately address specific situations.

ETV in Europe

ETV has been developed in different European countries as part of government initiatives and/or as part of funded research projects. Research projects included TESTNET, PROMOTE, AIR ETV, TRITECH ETV and ADVANCE ETV. Formal programs and initiatives took place in Denmark with the Danish Centre for Environmental Technology Verification (DANETV), the Nordic countries, including Denmark, Sweden, Finland and Norway, with the Nordic Environmental Technology Verification (NOWATEC) project, in France with the French ETV program and in a partnership between Denmark, The Netherlands and Germany with the Verification of Environmental Technologies for Agricultural Production (VERA). The European Union launched in 2011 an ETV Pilot Programme with the support from seven EU member states: Belgium, Czech Republic, Denmark, Finland, France, Poland and United Kingdom. This initiative was initially prepared under the Environmental Technologies Action Plan (ETAP) from the European Commission and was then followed under the Eco-Innovation Plan.

The European Commission has taken the decision to discontinue its work on the ETV programme as of November 2022, following an internal assessment.

The European Union ETV Pilot Program
Environmental Technology Verification (ETV) is a new tool to help innovative environmental technologies reach the market. Claims about the performance of innovative environmental technologies can be verified by qualified third parties called "Verification Bodies". The "Statement of Verification" delivered at the end of the ETV process can be used as evidence that the claims made about the innovation are both credible and scientifically sound. With proof of performance credibly assured, innovations can expect an easier market access and/or a larger market share and the technological risk is reduced for technology purchasers.

ETV in the UK
Under the EU-ETV Pilot Programme, there are four Verification Bodies:
 The European Marine Energy Centre: EMEC-ETV
 BRE Global: 
 National Physical Laboratory (NPL)
 Water Research Centre (WRc)

References

External links
 USEPA Environmental Technology Verification Program
 ETV Program Policy Compendium
 
 ETV Program website
 Clean school bus
 OTAQ
 ETV publications
 European ETV Program : RESCOLL web site
 French ETV website

Environmental technology
Pollution control technologies